Sant'Ambrogio di Valpolicella is a comune (municipality) in the Province of Verona in the Italian region Veneto, located about  west of Venice and about  northwest of Verona.

Sant'Ambrogio di Valpolicella borders the following municipalities: Cavaion Veronese, Dolcè, Fumane, Pastrengo, Pescantina, Rivoli Veronese, and San Pietro in Cariano.

Sights include the Romanesque pieve of San Giorgio, built in the 12th century over a Lombard (and perhaps pre-Roman) religious place. The interior has a nave and two aisles, of the same height, divided by piers. Some of the latter are decorated by 14th-century paintings. The basements of the columns are re-used Roman altars.  The church houses also 11th-century frescoes, including a Last Supper; also notable is the ciborium, built during the reign of the Lombard king Liutprand (711-744). The bell tower and the cloister are also from the 12th century.

Twinning
Sant'Ambrogio is twinned with: 
 Oppenheim, Germany
 Sant'Ambrogio di Torino, since 2004
 Sant'Ambrogio sul Garigliano, since 2004
 Sežana, Slovenia

References

External links
 Official website

Cities and towns in Veneto